Andy Murray defeated Novak Djokovic in the final, 6–4, 7–5, 6–4 to win the gentlemen's singles tennis title at the 2013 Wimbledon Championships. He became the first Briton to win the title since Fred Perry in 1936, ending a 76-year drought, as well as the first British winner in singles since Virginia Wade won the women's event in 1977. He was also the first Scot to win the title since Harold Mahony in 1896.

Roger Federer was the defending champion, but lost in the second round to Sergiy Stakhovsky. Federer's loss marked the first time since the 2004 French Open that he failed to reach the quarterfinals at a major. It was his earliest exit in Wimbledon since 2002, and the first time he lost to a player ranked outside the top 100 since 2005.

Djokovic advanced to the final after a five-set semifinal against Juan Martín del Potro. At 4 hours and 43 minutes this match was the then-longest semifinal ever contested at Wimbledon, breaking the previous record set by Boris Becker and Ivan Lendl in 1989.

In the first round, world No. 135 Steve Darcis defeated world No. 5 and two-time Wimbledon champion Rafael Nadal, the first time Nadal lost in the first round of a major. Federer and Nadal's early exits made this the first time since the 2004 French Open that neither of them appeared in the quarterfinals of a major, and the first time since 2002 that neither contested the Wimbledon final.

For the first time since 1912, no Americans advanced past the second round. For the first time, a Polish man reached a major semifinal after Jerzy Janowicz defeated compatriot Łukasz Kubot in the quarterfinals.

Seeds

  Novak Djokovic (final)
  Andy Murray (champion)
  Roger Federer (second round)
  David Ferrer (quarterfinals)
  Rafael Nadal (first round)
  Jo-Wilfried Tsonga (second round, retired with a left knee injury)
  Tomáš Berdych (quarterfinals)
  Juan Martín del Potro (semifinals)
  Richard Gasquet (third round)
  Marin Čilić (second round, withdrew)
  Stan Wawrinka (first round)
  Kei Nishikori (third round)
  Tommy Haas (fourth round)
  Janko Tipsarević (first round)
  Nicolás Almagro (third round)
  Philipp Kohlschreiber (first round, retired with fatigue)

  Milos Raonic (second round)
  John Isner (second round, retired with a left knee injury)
  Gilles Simon (first round)
  Mikhail Youzhny (fourth round)
  Sam Querrey (first round)
  Juan Mónaco (third round)
  Andreas Seppi (fourth round)
  Jerzy Janowicz (semifinals)
  Benoît Paire (third round)
  Alexandr Dolgopolov (third round)
  Kevin Anderson (third round)
  Jérémy Chardy (third round)
  Grigor Dimitrov (second round)
  Fabio Fognini (first round)
  Julien Benneteau (second round)
  Tommy Robredo (third round)

Qualifying

Draw

Finals

Top half

Section 1

Section 2

Section 3

Section 4

Bottom half

Section 5

Section 6

Section 7

Section 8

Annotations

References

External links

 2013 Wimbledon Championships – Men's draws and results at the International Tennis Federation

Men's Singles
Wimbledon Championship by year – Men's singles